Lyubov Andreevna Talalaeva (24 January 1953 – 24 May 2021) was a Russian rower who competed for the Soviet Union in the 1976 Summer Olympics. In 1976 she was a crew member of the Soviet boat which won the silver medal in the eights event.

References

External links
Lyubov Talalaeva's profile at Sports Reference.com
Lyubov Talalaeva's obituary 

1953 births
2021 deaths
Russian female rowers
Soviet female rowers
Olympic rowers of the Soviet Union
Rowers at the 1976 Summer Olympics
Olympic silver medalists for the Soviet Union
Olympic medalists in rowing
Medalists at the 1976 Summer Olympics